SV Ahlerstedt/Ottendorf is a German association football club from Ahlerstedt, Lower Saxony, best known for its men's and women's teams in all age groups. The men's senior team plays in the Landesliga Lüneburg, the sixth tier in the league pyramid.

History 
The club was founded in 1970 and started its footballing life in the lower leagues of the Stade district. The men's squad first reached the Verbandsliga Niedersachsen (V) in 1976 but was relegated after two seasons. SV returned as Bezirksoberliga Lüneburg (VI) champions in 1988 back to the fifth tier, now called Landesliga West, and transferred to the eastern division after one season. In 1991, it finished at fifth place and three years later became a founding member of the renamed Bezirksliga Lüneburg (VI) after reforms in the league system. SV had another tenure in 2009 to the renamed Niedersachsenliga (V) as Lüneburg champions and, despite a 12th-place result, dropped back to the newly renamed Landesliga after another reform.

The women's squad was one of the original teams in the Regionalliga Nord (III), finishing fourth in 2004–05, and five seasons later it achieved its best ever third-place finish behind runner-up Mellendorfer TV. After a last-place finish and 13 seasons in the Regionalliga, the SV women slipped to the Oberliga Niedersachsen (IV).

Honors 
Bezirksoberliga/Landesliga Lüneburg
Champions: 1988, 2009
Bezirkspokal Stade
Winners: 1976
Bezirkspokal Lüneburg
Winners: 1980

Current squad 
Autumn 2021 squad

References

External links 
Club website 

Football clubs in Germany
Football clubs in Lower Saxony
Women's football clubs in Germany
Association football clubs established in 1970
1970 establishments in West Germany